Larry Pierce may refer to:

 Larry Pierce (figure skater) (1937–1961), American ice dancer
 Larry S. Pierce (1941–1965), American soldier and Medal of Honor recipient
 Larry Pierce (singer) (1950–2018), American singer
 Larry Pierce (jockey) (born 1945), retired American Thoroughbred horse racing jockey

See also 
 Lawrence W. Pierce (born 1924), American federal judge